68th ACE Eddie Awards
January 26, 2018

Feature Film (Dramatic): Dunkirk

Feature Film (Comedy or Musical): I, Tonya

The 68th American Cinema Editors Eddie Awards were presented on January 26, 2018 at the Beverly Hilton Hotel, honoring the best editors in films and television.

Winners and nominees 

Winners will be listed first, highlighted in boldface.

Film 
Best Edited Feature Film – Dramatic:

 Lee Smith – Dunkirk
 Joe Walker – Blade Runner 2049
 Alan Baumgarten, Josh Schaeffer and Elliot Graham – Molly's Game
 Michael Kahn and Sarah Broshar – The Post
 Sidney Wolinsky – The Shape of Water

Best Edited Feature Film – Comedy or Musical:

 Tatiana S. Riegel – I, Tonya
 Jonathan Amos and Paul Machliss – Baby Driver
 Gregory Plotkin – Get Out
 Nick Houy – Lady Bird
 Jon Gregory – Three Billboards Outside Ebbing, Missouri

Best Edited Animated Feature Film:

 Steve Bloom – Coco
 Claire Dodgson – Despicable Me 3
 David Burrows, Matt Villa and John Venzon – The Lego Batman Movie

Best Edited Documentary Feature:

 Joe Beshenkovsky, Will Znidaric and Brett Morgen – Jane
 Aaron I. Butler – Cries from Syria
 Ann Collins – Joan Didion: The Center Will Not Hold
 T. J. Martin, Scott Stevenson and Daniel Lindsay – LA 92

Television 
Best Edited Comedy Series for Commercial Television:

 John Peter Bernardo and Jamie Pedroza – Black-ish: "Lemons"
 Kabir Akhtar and Kyla Plewes – Crazy Ex-Girlfriend: "Josh's Ex-Girlfriend Wants Revenge"
 Heather Capps, Ali Greer and Jordan Kim – Portlandia: "Amore"
 Peter Beyt – Will & Grace: "Grandpa Jack"

Best Edited Comedy Series for Non-Commercial Television:

 Jonathan Corn – Curb Your Enthusiasm: "The Shucker"
 Steven Rasch – Curb Your Enthusiasm: "Fatwa!"
 William Turro – GLOW: "Pilot"
 Roger Nygard and Gennady Fridman – Veep: "Chicklet"

Best Edited Drama Series for Commercial Television:

 Andrew Seklir – Fargo: "Who Rules the Land of Denial?"
 Skip Macdonald – Better Call Saul: "Chicanery"
 Kelley Dixon and Skip Macdonald – Better Call Saul: "Witness"
 Henk Van Eeghen – Fargo: "Aporia"

Best Edited Drama Series for Non-Commercial Television:

 Julian Clarke and Wendy Hallam Martin – The Handmaid's Tale: "Offred"
 David Berman – Big Little Lies: "You Get What You Need"
 Tim Porter – Game of Thrones: "Beyond the Wall"
 Kevin D. Ross – Stranger Things: "Chapter Nine: The Gate"

Best Edited Mini-Series or Motion Picture for Television:

 James D. Wilcox – Genius: "Einstein: Chapter One"
 Adam Penn and Ken Ramos – Feud: Bette and Joan: "Pilot"
 Ron Patane – The Wizard of Lies

Best Edited Documentary for Television:

 Will Znidaric – Five Came Back: "The Price of Victory"
 Lasse Järvi and Doug Pray – The Defiant Ones: "Part 1"
 Inbal Lessner – The Nineties: "Can We All Get Along?"
 Ben Sozanski, Geeta Gandbhir and Andy Grieve – Rolling Stone: Stories from the Edge: "01"

Best Edited Non-Scripted Series:

 Tim Clancy, Cameron Dennis, John Chimples and Denny Thomas – VICE News Tonight: "Charlottesville: Race & Terror"
 Rob Butler and Ben Bulatao – Deadliest Catch: "Lost at Sea"
 Reggie Spangler, Ben Simoff, Kevin Hibbard and Vince Oresman – Leah Remini: Scientology and the Aftermath: "The Perfect Scientology Family"

ACE Golden Eddie Honoree
 Vince Gilligan

Career Achievement Honorees
 Mark Goldblatt 
 Leon Ortiz-Gil

References

External links

68
2017 film awards
2017 guild awards
2017 in American cinema